Guido Ruggeri (active 1550s)  was an Italian engraver and to a lesser extent a painter. He was active in his native Bologna. He was a pupil of Francesco Francia, but went with Primaticcio to work with the School of Fontainebleau.

References

Italian engravers
16th-century Italian artists
Italian male painters
Painters from Bologna
Year of death unknown
Year of birth unknown